Zane (born 1966/1967) is the pseudonym of Kristina Laferne Roberts, author of erotic fiction novels. She is best known for her novel Addicted.

Biography
Kristina Laferne Roberts grew up in Washington DC and Silver Spring Maryland with her brother Deotis, and her two sisters Charmaine Roberts and Carlita Roberts. Her father J. Deotis Roberts, was an influential theologian and author, and her mother Elizabeth Caldwell Roberts was an elementary school teacher. Roberts attended Spelman College in Atlanta for one year, then moved Howard University to major in chemical engineering.
In 1997, Zane began writing erotic stories to pass the time after her children went to bed. She was living in North Carolina and working as a sales representative. The stories developed a following on the Internet and she self-published The Sex Chronicles before landing a deal with Simon & Schuster.

Her work was the basis for the Cinemax program Zane's Sex Chronicles. A subsequent project, Zane's The Jump Off, premiered March 29, 2013, on Cinemax.

Zane is the publisher of Strebor Books/Atria Books/Simon and Schuster where she publishes 36–60 books a year by other authors.

The first feature film based on one of her works, Addicted, was released by Lionsgate on October 10, 2014.

In 2014, she was cited by Comptroller of Maryland Peter Franchot as one of Maryland's top tax cheats, owing the state $340,833.58.

On June 11, 2014, Zane filed for Chapter 7 bankruptcy in U.S. Bankruptcy Court in Maryland, claiming total liabilities of more than $3.4 million.

Her work is mentioned in sociologist Shayne Lee's book Erotic Revolutionaries: Black Women, Sexuality, and Popular Culture. In it, Lee discusses Zane's work as an example of "urban erotica [that helps] create safe spaces for black female characters to explore lust and embark upon sexual experimentation."

Bibliography
Zane's publications include:
The Sex Chronicles: Shattering the Myth
Addicted
Shame On It All
Gettin’ Buck Wild: Sex Chronicles II
The Heat Seekers
Nervous
The Sisters of APF
Skyscraper
Afterburn
Dear G-Spot: Straight Talk about Sex and Love
Zane’s Sex Chronicles
Head Bangers: An APF Sexcapade
Total Eclipse of the Heart
Love Is Never Painless
Flava Series: Honey Flava, Caramel Flava, Chocolate Flava
Purple Panties
Missionary No More
The Hot Box
Vengeance
The Other Side of the Pillow  (2018)

References

External links

Official site
The African American Literature Reference Website

African-American novelists
American women novelists
Pseudonymous women writers
Writers from Washington, D.C.
People from Prince George's County, Maryland
American chick lit writers
1960s births
Living people
Year of birth uncertain
20th-century American novelists
21st-century American novelists
Women science fiction and fantasy writers
American erotica writers
20th-century American women writers
21st-century American women writers
Women erotica writers
20th-century pseudonymous writers
21st-century pseudonymous writers
20th-century African-American women
20th-century African-American people
21st-century African-American women writers
21st-century African-American writers